Prisca Chesang (born 7 August 2003) is a Ugandan middle- and long-distance runner. She won the bronze medal in the 5000 metres at the 2021 and 2022 World Athletics Under-20 Championships.

Chesang represented Uganda at the 2020 Tokyo Olympics, competing in the women's 5000 metres event.

She competed also in the 3000 metres at the 2021 World Athletics U20 Championships, finishing fourth with a personal best time of 9:03.44.

The 19-year-old won the 2022 San Silvestre Vallecana road 10 km (not eligible for record purposes) in a time of 30:19, beating Francine Niyonsaba, fifth in the 10,000 m at the Tokyo Games, and Beatrice Chepkoech, world record holder in the 3000 m steeplechase.

Achievements

Personal bests
 1500 metres – 4:08.15 (Nice 2021)
 3000 metres – 9:03.44 (Nairobi 2021)
 10,000 metres – 15:05.39 (Hengelo 2021)
Road
 10 kilometres – 32:42 (Bengaluru 2022)

National titles
 Ugandan Championships
 1500 metres: 2022
 5000 metres: 2022

References

External links
 

2003 births
Living people
Ugandan female long-distance runners
Athletes (track and field) at the 2020 Summer Olympics
Olympic athletes of Uganda
Place of birth missing (living people)
21st-century Ugandan women